HGS may refer to

HGS (gene), a human gene
HGS (electronic toll collection), used in highways and bridges in Turkey
Hampstead Garden Suburb, Greater London, England
Hastings Airport (Sierra Leone)
Hastings railway station, a railway station in Sussex, England
Head Gear System, a combat helmet
Head-up Guidance System, a transparent display that allows pilots to view aircraft flight data without needing to look down at the instrument panel.
Hervormd Gereformeerde Staatspartij, a Dutch political party
Human Genome Sciences, an American pharmaceutical company
HydroGeoSphere, hydrology modelling software
Mercury sulfide (HgS)
Halifax Grammar School, in Nova Scotia, Canada
 Handsworth Grammar School, in Birmingham, England
 The Harvey Grammar School, in Folkestone, Kent, England
 Heckmondwike Grammar School, in West Yorkshire, England